Tayshet (lit. cold river in the Kott language) is a town and the administrative center of Tayshetsky District in Irkutsk Oblast, Russia, located  northwest of Irkutsk, the administrative center of the oblast. Population:

History
It was founded in 1897 as a supply point and station on the Trans-Siberian Railway and was granted town status in 1938.

During the 1930s–1950s, Tayshet was the center of administration for gulag labor camps Ozerlag and Angarstroy. Construction of the first section of the Baikal–Amur Mainline started in 1937 and was managed from here. According to some survivor accounts, between Tayshet and Bratsk there is "a dead man under every sleeper." Along with Japanese prisoners from the Kwantung Army, German prisoners of war formed a large proportion of the forced labor contingent, generally under a 25-year sentence, such as Dietrich von Saucken. Surviving German POWs were repatriated in autumn of 1955, after West German Chancellor Konrad Adenauer's visit to Moscow.

Administrative and municipal status
Within the framework of administrative divisions, Tayshet serves as the administrative center of Tayshetsky District, to which it is directly subordinated. As a municipal division, the town of Tayshet is incorporated within Tayshetsky Municipal District as Tayshetskoye Urban Settlement.

Climate
Tayshet has a subarctic climate (Köppen Dfc) bordering on a humid continental climate with warm, humid summers and severely cold, drier winters. Sunshine is generous and the area receives 2,150 hours of bright sunshine annually.

Transportation
Tayshet railway station is a major railway junction. Here the Baikal–Amur Mainline begins, branching northeast from the Trans-Siberian Railway. Here also the Abakan-Taishet Railway ends.  The town is also on the M53 Highway (Moscow to Irkutsk).

References

Notes

Sources

Registry of the Administrative-Territorial Formations of Irkutsk Oblast

External links
Official website of Tayshet 
Unofficial website of Tayshet 

Cities and towns in Irkutsk Oblast